EuroGeneral is a variety store chain that trades as "EuroGiant" in Ireland.

History
More stores were opened throughout Ireland. In 2001, Euro General was set up and "PoundCity" was renamed "Euro 2" due to the introduction of the euro in 2002. The Euro 2 stores were later renamed "EuroGiant".

Operations
EuroGeneral has are two main divisions. Retail and Wholesale. EuroGeneral employs over 500 employees and has plans to expand. The retail stores are not franchised - they are said to be all privately owned by EuroGeneral. EuroGeneral wholesale helps to meet demand from other retailers. The division now supplies over 400 other retail outlets within Ireland and mainland Europe. EuroGeneral claims to be "Ireland's largest online supplier of FMCG and discount lines to the retail trade.

References

External links
 Official website

Irish companies established in 1990
Retail companies established in 1990
Retail companies of Ireland
Variety stores